Scott Township, Indiana may refer to one of the following places:

 Scott Township, Kosciusko County, Indiana
 Scott Township, Montgomery County, Indiana
 Scott Township, Steuben County, Indiana
 Scott Township, Vanderburgh County, Indiana

See also

Scott Township (disambiguation)

Indiana township disambiguation pages